Beacon Reservoir is the name of three artificial waterbodies in the United States:

 Beacon Reservoir (North Carolina)
 Beacon Reservoir (Dutchess County, New York)
 Beacon Reservoir (Putnam County, New York)